There were 22 judo events at the 2010 South American Games: 9 men's individual events, 9 women's individual events, men's and women's team and men's nage-no-kata and katame-no-kata. The events were held over March 19–22.

Medal summary

Medal table

Medalists

 
2010 South American Games
American Games, South
2010
Judo competitions in Colombia